Children's Book Council may refer to:

Children's Book Council (United States)
Children's Book Council of Australia